Eden Mohila College (known as Eden College), is a women's college in Azimpur, Dhaka, Bangladesh. It was established in 1873 in the Farashganj area of Dhaka. In 1878 the school was named after Ashley Eden, Lieutenant Governor of Bengal. The college moved to its present premises in 1963. It is affiliated with the University of Dhaka as of 16 February 2017.

History 
In 1873, the Shubhaswadhini Sabha established a school at Farashganj for the education of Brahmo girls. After 5 years of establishment, Dhaka Female School was established by merging another girls school with this school. In the same year, 1878, the school was converted into a government school and renamed Eden Girls' School. After coming under government management, the school was shifted to Laxmibazar. After 1897 the school was shifted to Sadarghat. In 1926, the school was converted into a college and renamed Eden Girls' High School and Higher Secondary College. The college was shifted again to Abdul Gani Road when AK Fazlul Haque was the Education Minister of Bengal. After the establishment of Pakistan, the college was shifted to Curzon Hall for administrative reasons, but in 1958, the college was merged with Kamrunnesa School and moved to Tikatuli where Kamrunnesa School had its campus. In 1962, the higher education section of Eden College was shifted to its present location and the following year, the Boxibazar branch of the college started as the Government Girls College, now known as Begum Badrunnesa Government Girls' College. Then Eden Girls College was named Eden Mahila College.

Faculties 

Faculty of Arts & Social Science

Department of Bangla

Department of English

Department of History

Department of Islamic History & Culture

Department of Philosophy

Department of Islamic Studies

Department of Economics

Department of Political Science
  
Department of Sociology

Department of Social Work

Faculty of Science

Department of Chemistry

Department of Physics

Department of Botany

Department of Zoology

Department of Statistics

Department of Mathematics

Department of Geography and Environmental Science

Department of Psychology

Faculty of Business Studies 

Department of Marketing

Department of Accounting

Department of Management

Department of Finance and Banking

Notable alumni

 Pritilata Waddedar - Bengali revolutionary
 Sheikh Hasina - current Prime Minister of Bangladesh
 Amena Begum - Politician
 Monira Rahman - Human rights activist
 Ferdousi Mazumder - Actress
 Matia Chowdhury - Politician
 Dilara Zaman - Actress

Notable faculty

 Akhtar Imam - from the mid-1940s until 1956.
 Siddika Kabir
 Khodeja Khatun - a writer, was a professor of Bangla from 1960 to 1968, and became its principal in 1972.

Courses

Honors degree 
Master's degree
Degree pass course

Controversy

On 22 September, 2022, Chhatra League's Eden College branch vice-president Jannatul Ferdous raised allegations of various irregularities against president Tamanna Jasmine Riva and general secretary Razia Sultana to the media. So on the night of 24 September, Riva and Razia's team attacked her in the college area. When Jannat, the victim of torture, threatened to commit suicide, the enraged attackers fled the college at night.

In a press conference, 25 leaders of the college threatened to resign if action was not taken against Riva and Razia on afternoon of 25 September. Later, Riva and Razia's supporters clashed with their rival factions on 25 September when they attended a press conference arranged by Riva–Razia. The two groups clashed several times in the college area that day.

College authorities formed a committee on September 25 to investigate the incident. On the same day, the central council of the BCL expelled 16 workers of the Eden College branch based on preliminary evidence and announced the suspension of the branch's activities. On 26 September, the expelled leaders told the media that the central council of the BCL expelled only a section of the branch to systematically suspend the activities of the entire branch by keeping the committee. They alleged that the Riva–Razia group were not expelled despite evidence. The oustees demanded the withdrawal of the eviction order on them. Those expelled from the party planned to go on a hunger strike to demand their demands, but came back from that decision after the assurance of the BCL leaders.

These issues are not new but old in this college. The expelled leaders accused Riva and Razia of extorting hall rooms, corruption and abuse of power and using college girls as prostitutes, but the Central Committee of Chhatra League denied these allegations. A former student of the college, Liza Akhtar Hossain, claimed on Facebook that the college forced female students to become political activists.

In response, the college branch of Chhatra Dal called for resistance against the Chhatra League to make the campus safe for female students. The Central Women's Division of Bangladesh Jamaat-e-Islami in a statement condemned the incident and called upon the government to restore the campus environment. Supriya Bhattacharya, the professor of the college, indirectly denied the allegation that Eden College was under the control of BCL. She sees the incident as the students' fault and feels counseling them will solve the problem.

In response to the incident, Sultana Kamal wrote in a column in Prothom Alo, "Eden College Chhatra League leadership is not alone responsible for this situation. The Central Chhatra League, which is responsible for managing Eden College Chhatra League, the leadership of Awami League, which is responsible for managing that Chhatra League—all have responsibility here. Everyone has to fulfill their respective responsibilities. No. Instead, everyone is condoning this unaccountable lawlessness. Sadly, no one is concerned about the destruction of our children's future." Professor Tanjim Uddin Khan of the Department of International Relations of Dhaka University blamed the negligence of the college authorities for this incident.

On September 28, Jannatul Ferdausi filed a case against the torturers in the Dhaka Metropolitan Court.

See also
 List of colleges under University of Dhaka
 Muminunnesa Women's College
 Pakundia Adarsha Mohila College

References

External links

 
1958 establishments in East Pakistan
Universities and colleges in Dhaka
Educational institutions established in 1958
Women's universities and colleges in Bangladesh
University of Dhaka affiliates